Heywood is a civil parish and small village in the county of Wiltshire in southwestern England.

Heywood village, which has approximately 200 inhabitants, lies between the A350 national route and the B3461 road, which links nearby Yarnbrook and the Westbury industrial area. The hamlet of Dursley lies directly to the west of the village on the other side of the railway line. The parish also includes the hamlets of Hawkeridge and Norleaze; in the south are the West Wilts Trading Estate and part of The Ham, close to Westbury.

The Biss Brook forms the west and north-west boundary of the parish.

History
For most of its history, Heywood formed part of the parish and hundred of Westbury. From the 13th century the manor of Heywood was an estate of Stanley Abbey. It was acquired by Sir Edward Bayntun in 1537; later landowners included the Long family and the Earls of Marlborough.

In 1848 the Wilts, Somerset and Weymouth Railway was built through the parish, passing between Heywood and Dursley, to link the Swindon-Bath line (near Chippenham) with Westbury via Trowbridge. This line remains open.

The civil parish of Heywood was created in 1896 from the northern section of Westbury parish; part of Heywood was transferred back to Westbury in 1909.

Brook Hall 

Brook Hall, in the west of Heywood parish near the Biss Brook, is a c. 1600 farmhouse which incorporates a Grade I listed wing of a 15th-century manor house.

Heywood House 
James Ley (Member of Parliament for Westbury, and later Lord High Treasurer and Earl of Marlborough), and his brother Matthew (also MP for Westbury) acquired land at Heywood in the early 17th century, and James built a house there. His grandson James, 3rd Earl pursued a naval career and sold most of his Wiltshire property, including the house, soon after he came into his inheritance in 1638.

In 1700 the house was bought by Thomas Phipps (c. 1648 – 1715), who came from a family of Westbury cloth merchants and had made money in London by trading with the East Indies and New England. His son William Phipps, a former Governor of Bombay, died at the house in 1748. Later in the century the house came into the Ludlow family, and in 1837 Henry Gaisford Gibbs Ludlow had the present Heywood House built on the same site, east of the present A350.

On Henry's death in 1876 the house passed to Henry Charles Lopes, of the Lopes family who owned Westbury manor. Henry Lopes was created Baron Ludlow in 1897; the title became extinct in 1922 on the death of his son, also Henry Lopes. Since then the house had several owners and for a time housed the headquarters of the National Trust; in 1987 it was designated as Grade II* listed. The house is now multi-tenanted offices.

Governance
From 1935 until 1974, Heywood was part of the Warminster and Westbury Rural District, which was abolished by the Local Government Act 1972, when it joined the new West Wiltshire district. Since the abolition of West Wiltshire as a district in 2009, all significant local government functions have been carried out by the new Wiltshire Council unitary authority.

Heywood falls within the South West Wiltshire parliamentary constituency, which has been represented since 2001 by Andrew Murrison (Conservative).

Religious sites 
A small Congregational church was built at Hawkeridge in 1844. As of 2015 the church remains in use.

The Church of England parish church of the Holy Trinity was built in 1849 and served a new ecclesiastical parish which was formed from the northern part of the parish of Westbury. The building is in the 13th-century style; Pevsner describes the east window of 1876 as "especially horrible". The church closed in 1981 and was converted for residential use.

Amenities 
There is a pub at Hawkeridge, the Royal Oak.

The village primary school was closed in 1971. It had been built in 1836 at the expense of Henry G.G. Ludlow and educated children of all ages until 1930.

The Eaves Learning Centre, just over the north boundary of the parish near Dursley, is a small independent school for children with special needs aged 8 to 19, run by Witherslack Group.

Notable people
John Barnard Bush, Lord Lieutenant of Wiltshire 2004 to 2012, farmed at Heywood.

References 

W. H. Hamilton Rogers, The Strife of the Roses & Days of the Tudors in the West (Exeter: 1890): on-line text

External links
Wiltshire Community History: Heywood

Civil parishes in Wiltshire
Villages in Wiltshire